Operation Napoleon (Icelandic: Napóleonsskjölin) is an Icelandic thriller film directed by Óskar Þór Axelsson. It is based on Arnaldur Indriðason's best selling book of the same name. It stars Vivian Ólafsdóttir, Iain Glen, Jack Fox, Ólafur Darri Ólafsson and Wotan Wilke Möhring.

Plot
The film tells the story of Kristín, an ambitious lawyer who is drawn into an unexpected sequence of events when her brother stumbles upon a World War II plane wreck on top of Vatnajökull.

References

External links

2023 thriller films
Icelandic thriller films